Gerard Smith may refer to:

Sir Gerard Smith (governor) (1839–1920), governor of Western Australia
Gerard C. Smith (1914–1994), U.S. diplomat
Gerard Smith (Gaelic footballer) (born 1994), Gaelic footballer
Gerard Smith (musician) (1974–2011), musician with TV on the Radio
Gerard Corley Smith (1909–1997), environmentalist
Gerard Edwards Smith  (1804–1881), Church of England cleric and botanist

See also
Gerard Smyth (born 1951), Irish poet
Jerry Smith (disambiguation)
Gerald Smith (disambiguation)